The Smurf Amplifier Registry is a blacklist of networks on the Internet which have been misconfigured in such a way that they can be used as smurf amplifiers for smurf denial of service attacks.

It can probe networks for vulnerability to smurf amplification, and then will either add them to its database, or remove them from the database, depending on the result of the test.

External links 
 The Smurf Amplifier Registry

Denial-of-service attacks